Achillea is a group of flowering plants.

Achillea may also refer to:

Achillea (band), a band
Chilia Veche, a town, formerly called Achillea